= Victoria College School =

- Amman; Jordan

Information
- Type: private
- School district: Amman
- Grades: K-12
- Colors: green, white

Victoria College School is an international private, non-profit, co-educational day school in Amman, Jordan. It is from kindergarten through high school. The school has branches in Egypt, Saudi Arabia and other countries.

Facilities include:

- Twenty-three classrooms
- Library
- Music Room
- Physics, Chemistry, Biology Labs
- Art Room
- Soccer, basketball courts
- Auditorium
- computer rooms

On 25 October 2018, 44 students and staff members were swept away by floods in the Dead Sea region in Amman, Jordan, whilst on a field trip, which resulted in 18 deaths and 34 injuries in what has been called the Dead Sea disaster.

There has been immense backlash aimed at the school following the accident; criticizing that the school allowed the field trip during unstable weather and the fact that the official documents stated that the destination for the field trip was not the Dead Sea but the Al Azraq region. The documents also reveal that the approved number of students was 30, when in fact 37 students attended the trip.
